During World War II, Operation Defoe was a reconnaissance patrol by 21 men of the Special Air Service conducted from 19 July to 23 August to support the British Second Army in the Argentan area of Normandy.

Operation Overlord
Special Air Service operations
World War II British Commando raids